The 2012 Winnipeg Blue Bombers season was the 55th season for the team in the Canadian Football League and their 80th overall. The Blue Bombers looked to continue on the success of the 2011 season, in which they made it all the way to the Grey Cup game. However, the team slipped to 3rd place in the East Division and missed the playoffs, finishing with a 6–12 record. The team was supposed to play their first season in their new stadium, Investors Group Field, but ongoing construction delays have moved its opening to the beginning of the 2013 season. The Blue Bombers started the season with four straight road games, which was due to speculation that the stadium would be opened in time for a home opener in week 5 at the earliest. The Blue Bombers started the season 0–4 for the first time since 2008, which was also, coincidentally, a year after they had an appearance in the Grey Cup game.

After a 2–6 start, head coach Paul LaPolice was fired on August 25, 2012, after three years of employment. He was replaced by defensive coordinator Tim Burke.

The low point of the season occurred in Tim Burke's debut as head coach on September 2, 2012, in which the team suffered a 52–0 shutout loss to their biggest rivals the Saskatchewan Roughriders in the Labour Day Classic. It was the Bombers first shutout loss since they were blanked 33–0 by the Edmonton Eskimos on July 29, 1969. It was also their first shutout loss to Saskatchewan since October 15, 1949.

With a 28–18 loss to the Hamilton Tiger-Cats on October 27, 2012, the Blue Bombers were eliminated from playoff contention. Their final game of the season, a 19–11 victory over the Montreal Alouettes, would mark the final game played at Canad Inns Stadium prior to its demolition.

Offseason

CFL draft
The 2012 CFL Draft took place on May 3, 2012, live at 2:00 PM CDT. The Blue Bombers had five selections in the six-round draft, including the loss of their first-round pick after selecting Kito Poblah in the 2011 Supplemental draft. The traded back into the first round by trading two of their second round picks for the third overall selection.

Preseason

Regular season

Season standings

Season schedule

Roster

Coaching staff

References

Winnipeg Blue Bombers seasons
Winn